Kenneth Allen Fox is an American entrepreneur and investor.

Early life and education
Fox grew up in the suburbs of Philadelphia, Pennsylvania, where he started his first business at the age of 15, later graduating from Pennsylvania State University, with a B.S. in economics. He led the formation of The Fox Challenge at Pennsylvania State University. He completed his first IPO at 29.

Career

Stripes
In 2008, Fox founded Stripes, LLC, a Manhattan-based growth equity firm that invests in software-as-a-service (SaaS), and branded consumer products companies. He is actively involved with Stripes portfolio companies Pleo, Monday.com, ON Running, Reformation, Udemy, Stella & Chewy’s, GoFundMe, Levain, Kareo, Erewhon, Snyk, Axonius, Fireblocks and Collectors Universe.

ICG
Fox co-founded the Internet Capital Group (ICG) in 1995 and ICG Asia, a Hong Kong-listed company later sold to Hutchison Whampoa.

Safeguard Scientifics
Fox worked as Director of West Coast operations for Safeguard Scientifics, Inc. from 1994 to 1996.

He is also a co-founder of A10 Capital, a commercial mortgage lender.

Honors and awards
Fox was named the Ernst and Young Entrepreneur of the Year in 2000. He won the Golden Plate Award from the American Academy of Achievement, and was named by the Industry Standard as the Most Innovative B2B Executive.

Personal life
Fox is a board member of the TEAK Fellowship, a Development Partner of Acumen, and a supporter of code.org.

References

External links
 

American financiers
Businesspeople from Philadelphia
Living people
Year of birth missing (living people)